Gari Mea (born 11 February 1976) is a former Papua New Guinean woman cricketer. She was also a member of the Papua New Guinean cricket team during the 2008 Women's Cricket World Cup Qualifier.

References

External links 

1976 births
Living people
Papua New Guinean women cricketers